The sixth and planned final season of The Crown, which follows the life and reign of Queen Elizabeth II, is in production and expected to be released by Netflix in 2023. It is the only season of the series to be produced following the death of Queen Elizabeth II on 8 September 2022.

Premise 
The Crown traces the reign of Queen Elizabeth II from her wedding in 1947 through to the early 21st century. The sixth season is expected to focus on the late 1990s until the early 2000s.

Cast
 Imelda Staunton as Queen Elizabeth II
 Viola Prettejohn as young Princess Elizabeth
 Jonathan Pryce as Prince Philip, Duke of Edinburgh, Elizabeth's husband
 Lesley Manville as Princess Margaret, Countess of Snowdon, Elizabeth's younger sister
 Beau Gadsdon as young Princess Margaret
 Dominic West as Charles, Prince of Wales, Elizabeth and Philip's eldest child and the heir apparent
 Olivia Williams as Camilla Parker Bowles, Charles' long-time lover
 Elizabeth Debicki as Diana, Princess of Wales, Charles' ex-wife
 Khalid Abdalla as Dodi Fayed, Diana's lover who died alongside her in a 1997 car crash
 Salim Daw as Mohamed Al-Fayed, Dodi Fayed's father
 Bertie Carvel as Tony Blair, Prime Minister 1997–2007
 Lydia Leonard as Cherie Blair, Tony Blair's wife
 Andrew Havill as Robert Fellowes, the Queen's private secretary and brother-in-law of Princess Diana
 Marcia Warren as Queen Elizabeth The Queen Mother, widow of King George VI, mother of Queen Elizabeth II and Princess Margaret
 Claudia Harrison as Anne, Princess Royal, Elizabeth and Philip's second child and only daughter
 Theo Fraser Steele as Timothy Laurence, Princess Anne's husband
 James Murray as Prince Andrew, Duke of York, Elizabeth and Philip's third child
 Sam Woolf as Prince Edward, Elizabeth and Philip's youngest child
 Ed McVey as Prince William of Wales, Charles and Diana's elder son and the second-in-line for the British throne
 Rufus Kampa as young Prince William of Wales
 Meg Bellamy as Kate Middleton, a classmate of Prince William
 Luther Ford as Prince Harry of Wales, Charles and Diana's younger son and the third-in-line to the British throne
 Will Powell as young Prince Harry of Wales
 Richard Rycroft as George Carey, the Archbishop of Canterbury
 Timothy Dutton as Michael Middleton

Production

Development 
Though the series was initially planned to run for six seasons, in January 2020 creator Peter Morgan announced that the series would instead conclude with the fifth season. In July 2020, Morgan reversed his decision and announced that the series would end with a sixth season as originally planned, saying, "As we started to discuss the storylines for Season 5, it soon became clear that in order to do justice to the richness and complexity of the story we should go back to the original plan and do six seasons. To be clear, Season 6 will not bring us any closer to present-day — it will simply enable us to cover the same period in greater detail."

Casting 
In January 2020, Imelda Staunton was announced as succeeding Colman as the Queen in the fifth season, and her role in the final sixth season was reported in July. Also in July 2020, Lesley Manville was announced as portraying Princess Margaret, and the following month, Jonathan Pryce and Elizabeth Debicki had been cast as Prince Philip and Diana, Princess of Wales, respectively. In October 2020, Dominic West was in talks to play Prince Charles and was officially confirmed as part of the cast in April 2021. In June 2021, Olivia Williams announced that she would portray Camilla Parker Bowles. In September 2022, Rufus Kampa and Ed McVey were cast as Prince William, while Meg Bellamy was cast as Kate Middleton. Viola Prettejohn was cast as young Elizabeth, while Beau Gadsdon reprised her role as young Margaret, for flashback scenes set on Victory in Europe Day.

Filming 
Filming for the season began in early September 2022, but was paused following the death of Queen Elizabeth II on 8 September 2022. Filming resumed the following week, but paused on the day of Elizabeth's funeral on 19 September 2022.

References

External links
 
 

6
Upcoming television seasons